A hard is a firm or paved beach or slope by water that is convenient for hauling boats out of the water. The term is especially used in Hampshire, southern England.

See also 
 Buckler's Hard, Hampshire
 Priddy's Hard, Gosport, Hampshire
 The Hard Interchange, Portsmouth, Hampshire, next to the Hard
 Dock (maritime)

References 

Coastal construction
Nautical terminology